Nicolae Dabija may refer to:

Nicolae Dabija (general) (1837–1884), Romanian general and politician
Nicolae Dabija (politician) (1948–2021), former member of the Moldovan Parliament
Nicolae Dabija (soldier) (1907–1949), Romanian anti-communist resistance leader

See also 
 Dabija